In Buddhism, nirodha, "cessation," "extinction," or "suppression," refers to the cessation or renouncing of craving and desire. It is the third of the Four Noble Truths, stating that suffering (dukkha) ceases when craving and desire are renounced. 

According to Thubten Chodron, Nirodha is the final disappearance of all bad experiences and their causes in such a way that they can no longer occur again. This is achieved through the cultivation of the Noble Eightfold Path, which includes the practices of right understanding, right intention, right speech, right action, right livelihood, right effort, right mindfulness, and right concentration. The attainment of nirodha leads to the realization of Nibbana (also known as Nirvana), a state of perfect peace and freedom from suffering.

See also

References

Sources

 
 

Buddhist philosophical concepts
Suffering